McAleenan is a surname. Notable people with the surname include:

Des McAleenan, Irish expatriate American soccer player and coach
Kevin McAleenan (born 1971), American lawyer and government official
Máirín McAleenan, camogie player
Paul McAleenan (born 1951), Irish Roman Catholic bishop